Yaowalak Traisurat (born 1 March 1984), nicknamed Jiab is a beauty queen from Nakhon Si Thammarat, Thailand, who won the Miss Thailand Universe pageant in 2003 and previously won the Miss Teen Thailand pageant in 2000.

Biography
Traisurat obtained a bachelor's degree from King Mongkut's Institute of Technology Ladkrabang where her father was a professor.

She's currently studying master's degree at King Mongkut's Institute of Technology Ladkrabang.

Pageantry
Traisurat was crowned Miss Teen Thailand 2000 and Miss Thailand Universe on 29 March 2003.

After winning the Miss Thailand Universe title, she represented Thailand in the Miss Universe 2003 pageant held in Panama but did not place.  The pageant was won by Amelia Vega of Dominican Republic.

Facts/trivia
 Traisurat is the only Miss Teen Thailand winner to hold the title Miss Thailand Universe
 She was a major favourite by press from the very beginning and won expectedly
 She also came first in the Miss Photogenic Award and Miss Popular Vote Award
 She has a twin sister

External links
Crowning Moment
Sawasdee Pageant The Majestic World of Beauty Pageant

1983 births
Living people
Miss Universe 2003 contestants
Yaowalak Traisurat
Yaowalak Traisurat
Yaowalak Traisurat
Miss Teen Thailand